Table tennis was contested from 1 October 2002 to 9 October 2002 at the 2002 Asian Games in Dongchun Gymnasium, Ulsan, South Korea.

Table tennis had team, doubles and singles events for men and women, as well as a mixed doubles competition.

Schedule

Medalists

Medal table

Participating nations
A total of 105 athletes from 18 nations competed in table tennis at the 2002 Asian Games:

References 

2002 Asian Games Official Report, Pages 710–716
Official website

External links 
Results

 
2002
Asian Games
2002 Asian Games events